Jude is the seventh studio album by English singer-songwriter Julian Lennon, released on 9 September 2022. The album's title is a reference to the Beatles' 1968 song "Hey Jude", written by Paul McCartney for the then five-year-old Julian.

The album was announced with the release of the singles "Freedom" and "Every Little Moment" on 8 April 2022, Lennon's 59th birthday. Two additional singles, "Save Me" and "Breathe", were released on 22 June 2022. The single "Lucky Ones" was released on 3 August 2022, and a groundbreaking music video for it was released on 24 October 2022. The album cover photo of Julian as a child was taken by May Pang in 1974.

Track listing

Personnel

Musicians
 Julian Lennon - Arranger, Art Direction, Composer, Concept, Cover Design, Editing, Engineer, Guitar (Acoustic), Keyboards, Percussion, Primary Artist, Producer, Production Coordination, Programming, Vocals
 Paul Buchanan - Featured Artist, Vocals
 Bulgarian Symphony Orchestra - Strings
 Justin Clayton - Bass, Engineer, Guitar (Electric), Producer, Production Coordination, Strings
 Charlie Corrie - Guitar (Acoustic)
 Gregory Darling - Composer, Guitar (Acoustic), Keyboards, Piano
 John Zach Dellinger - Viola
 Tim Ellis - Composer, Guitar, Keyboards
 Vanessa Freebairn-Smith - Cello
 Martijn Garritsen - Composer, Guitar
 Neel Hammond - String Arrangements, Violin
 Felix Higginbottom - Percussion
 Ben Jacobsen - Violin
 Elissa Lauper - Composer, Featured Artist, Vocals
 Bill Laurance - Composer, Keyboards
 Michael League - Bass
 John McCurry - Guitar (Acoustic), Guitar (Electric)
 Tony Moore - Composer, Piano
 Oklahoma Film Orchestra - Strings
 Grant Ransom - Composer, Guitar, Keyboards
 Leland Sklar - Bass
 Ash Soan - Drums
 Mark Spiro - Composer, Guitar (Acoustic), Vocals (Background)
 Peter-John Vettese - Composer, Keyboards, Piano, Programming

Production
 Gregg Alexander - Composer
 Robert Ascroft - Photography [Inside Cover]
 David Becker - Image Editing
 Adam Brookes - Artwork, Graphic Design
 Brian Byrne - Producer, String Arrangements
 Guy Chambers - Composer
 Justin Clayton - Bass, Engineer, Guitar (Electric), Producer, Production Coordination, Strings
 Patrick Conlon - Engineer
 Gregory Darling - Composer
 David Dutton - Art Direction, Artwork, Graphic Design, Animation
 Tim Ellis - Composer
 Kristoffer Fogelmark - Composer
 Brian Frank - A&R
 Martijn Garritsen - Composer
 Rosabella Gregory - String Arrangements
 Neel Hammond - String Arrangements
 Kaylee Largay - Production Coordination
 Bill Laurance - Composer
 Elissa Lauper - Composer
 Julian Lennon - Arranger, Art Direction, Composer, Concept, Cover Design, Editing, Engineer, Guitar (Acoustic), Keyboards, Percussion, Primary Artist, Producer, Production Coordination, Programming, Vocals
 John David "Moon" Martin - Composer
 Randy Merrill - Mastering
 Tony Moore - Composer
 Albin Nedler - Composer
 May Pang - Photography [Front Cover]
 Grant Ransom - Composer
 Bob Rose - String Arrangements
 Jaime Sickora - Engineer
 Mark Spiro - Composer
 Mark "Spike" Stent - Mixing
 Allie Stimatze - Production Coordination
 Peter John Vettese - Composer
 Rebecca Warfield - Management, Production Coordination
 Matt Wolach - Mixing Assistant
 Michel Zitron - Composer

Charts

The "Lucky Ones" single debuted in the Billboard Adult Alternative Airplay chart at No. 37.

Critical reception
Jacob Uitti writing for American Songwriter said the singles "Freedom" and "Every Little Moment" that were included on Jude were "poignant", offering "emotional aid in a difficult global time, as much as they give assistance to those experiencing difficult personal times internally."

For Spin, Liza Lentini praised Jude as a moving album that looks back in the name of progress.

Goldmine wrote about the release, "With his new album, the first in 11 years, Julian advances his body of work that has always simultaneously explored personal and global themes, but for the first time in his life, he's embracing his inner status as someone's son...[an] introspective masterwork from a diversely talented artist."

References

2022 albums
Julian Lennon albums
BMG Rights Management albums